Frank Darien (March 18, 1876 – October 20, 1955) was an American actor. He appeared in 225 films and between 1915 and 1951.

Filmography

References

External links

1876 births
1955 deaths
American male film actors
Male actors from New Orleans
20th-century American male actors